Mats Wahl (born May 10, 1945 in Malmö, Sweden) is a Swedish author. He has published 43 books but also written several plays for the theatre, TV programs, novels and movies. Vinterviken (in English: the Winter bay) is one of his most famous books, which is also a film.

Bibliography

På spaning efter växandets punkt
Konsten att undervisa
Honungsdrömmen
Hallonörnen
Vinterfågel
Förståelse och handling
Guntzborg Jöntzon
Norrpada
Döläge
Ungdomspedagogik
Halva sanningen
Havsörnsvalsen
Hat
Jiggen
Husbonden
Utbildning och klass
Mannen som älskade kvinnor
Den lackerade apan
Anna-Carolinas krig
Skrinet
Jac Uppmuntraren
Play it again
Sjöbo
Maj Darlin
Kärlek i september
Sagan om den lilla kråkodillen
Därvarns resa 
Nåra riktigt fina dar
Vinterviken
Vildmarksfiskaren
I ballong över Stilla havet
Lilla Marie
Nu seglar Vasa
Emma och Daniel: Mötet
De övergivna
3 Pjäser
 Den långa resan (with Sven Nordqvist)
1998 - Emma och Daniel: Kärleken
1998 - Emma och Daniel: Resan
John-John
Folket i Birka på vikingarnas tid
1999 - Maj Darlin
Den osynlige
Halva sanningen
Såpa
Tjafs
Kill
Svenska för idioter
Återkomst
2006 - Den vilda drömmen
2008 – När det kommer en älskare

Awards

Nils Holgersson-plaketten for the book Maj Darlin
Nordiske Börnebogspriset
Augustpriset for the book Vinterviken
ABF:s litteraturpris
Janusz Korczak-priset
Deutscher Jugendliteraturpreis for Vinterviken
Kulturpriset Till Adam Brombergs minne (Adamspriset)

External links
Storyland
Författarförmedlingen - Mats Wahl

Living people
Swedish male writers
1945 births
August Prize winners